Teatro Popular do SESI  is a theatre in São Paulo, Brazil. Almost Nothing premiered here in 2003.

References

Theatres in São Paulo